Winter Guard International (WGI) is an American performing arts association, governing body, and the producer of regional championship events for three activities: color guard (known as winter guard), percussion ensembles, and small marching bands (known as winds). WGI's competitive season is January to March, ending with an annual World Championships in April; hence, "winter" in the association's name.

WGI was founded in 1977 as a response to the inconsistent adjudication and incompatible rules of competition between various regional governing bodies and competition circuits which made it difficult for color guards to compete nationally. Today, WGI regularly publishes and updates an adjudication handbook, with an accompanying "Rules & Regulations", that has been adopted worldwide.

The first WGI World Championship for was held in 1978, then called WGI Olympics. World championships for percussion ensembles began in 1992, and winds in 2015. A series of fall marching band regional competitions, promoted as the WGI Friendship Cup, were hosted until 2003. In March 2020, WGI announced all 2020 World Championship events would be cancelled, as would all remaining regional championship events, in response to the ongoing COVID-19 pandemic. The 2021 Season was held virtually.

A majority of WGI's championships are hosted in the United States, however regional championships have been frequently hosted in Japan, Malaysia, United Kingdom, Netherlands, and the Philippines and Costa Rica in 2018.

History 
Prior to the formation of WGI, national color guard championships, or other high-prestige championships, were held in conjunction with drum corps or marching band championships, such as: VFW, American Legion, or CYO national championships, or the U.S. Open or World Open Championships. The host or event promoters often varied widely, as did as the quality of the venue, the rules of competition, and adjudication and scoring. As an example, the 1977 "national" championship was held in conjunction with DCI World Championships in Denver. The venue was too small, there was no functional air conditioning, and the performance area required color guards to maneuver around structural columns.

In 1977, then director of the Seattle Imperials, Stanley Knaub, secured a sponsor and a potential venue for a new national championships; however, he sought input from others in the activity on how to proceed. Knaub invited color guard educators from across the country to meet the weekend of May 14, 1977 at the Sheraton Palace Hotel in San Francisco. Those in attendance included: Don Angelica, Shirlee Whitcomb, Bryan Johnston, Marie Czapinski, and Linda Chambers. In addition to standard rules and adjudication, all agreed any future national championship should be held independent of drum corps or marching band events. Knaub suggested scheduling the event during the winter months when most color guards competed locally—following marching band season, but prior to the drum corps season. The name "winter guard" was suggested by Don Angelica to reflect this change, which was adopted as the name of a new governing body and championships host: Winter Guard International.

A follow-up meeting at the 1977 DCI Rules Congress included representatives from thirteen color guard circuits and adjudicator associations. The representatives adopted an adjudication system and draft rulebook, as well as an organizational structure. Lynn Lindstrom, director of the Midwest Color Guard Circuit, was elected the first Executive Director of WGI. Four circuits each donated $250 to fund WGI's first competitive season, which included: fourteen regional championships, and a two-day national championship called the WGI Olympics. The national championships would later become the WGI World Championships.

About 
WGI is a nonprofit association governed by a board of directors, with an Executive Director, responsible for day-to-day operations. The board of directors are chosen from among the directors of competing groups, and at-large members are chosen from the community of color guard, percussion, and winds educators. The board of directors is legally and financially responsible for the conduct of the organization. In 2019, WGI's various programs and activities generated  million in revenues.

Mission and purpose 
The mission of organization is to provide a venue for young people to achieve the extraordinary through performance and competition. WGI organizes "high-energy and enjoyable" events for color guard, called winter guard, percussion and winds, divisions. The organization also aims to improve quality of the competing groups through leadership development and education. This includes standardized adjudication.

WGI frequently partners with companies that provide services and products to competing groups, as well as leading educators in other fields to highlight the activity. The organization is promoted using the tagline: Sport of the Arts.

Advisory Boards 
Each of the three competitive divisions (color guard, percussion and winds) are led by Advisory Boards who are responsible for the "adjudication and competitive attributes" of sanctioned events. Advisory boards are also responsible for nominating and electing members to the board of directors.

The Advisory Boards meet annually, usually a few months after World Championships, to discuss changes to rules of competition, adjudication, and policies and procedures, and to make recommendations to the board of directors. The promotion of competing groups is also the responsibility of the Advisory Boards.

Membership 
Groups that compete at WGI events are required to pay a membership fee, in addition to an attendance fee for each event. Only groups who compete in a regional, beginner, class with limited availability (Regional A Class) are excused from paying a membership fee. The fees support general operations, and provide capital for future events, educational services, and research and development.

Scholarships 
WGI awards academic scholarships to members of competing groups, which are announced during awards ceremonies at World Championships. Funds for scholarships are raised via raffles drawn during WGI events known as “Fifty-fifty”.

Hosted competitions 
Using a competition-based approach for organizing events, WGI "aims to showcase youth activities" by pursuing a "high standard of achievement."

More than sixty regional championships are hosted every year, from mid-January to the late-March. Many are hosted in with the aid of WGI's regional circuit partners. Regional championships attract hundreds of color guards, percussion and winds ensembles, and thousands of participants. To qualify for World Championships, groups must compete in at least one regional championship.

World Championships regularly attracts over 350 color guards, 250 percussion ensembles, and over 40 winds groups. Championships occur over two consecutive weekends in early or mid-April. Future World Championships dates have been reserved until 2024.

Alterations due to Covid-19 
In March 2020, the 2020 World Championships were cancelled in response to the COVID-19 pandemic. The 2021 WGI season was conducted using online tools as a WGI Virtual Season. Participants were given the option to participate in solo, small group, and large group categories.

Past championship sites

Classification and adjudication 
WGI fosters and develops events for three activities.

Winter Guard 

Winter guard is the indoor variant of color guard and is a combination of the use of flags, sabers, mock rifles, and various other equipment and props. Performances include dance and other interpretive movement. Color guards are common among high schools, middle schools, some universities, and also some independent organizations such as drum corps, or they are community organizations. The term "winter guard" is taken from the season most color guards compete as single units, and not part of marching bands or drum corps.

Percussion 
An indoor percussion ensemble or indoor drumline consists of the marching percussion (also called the "battery") and front ensemble (also called pit or front line) sections. Many ensembles, like color guards, are attached to a competing marching band or drum corps. Indoor percussion integrates musicality, marching and movement, and theater arts. The activity is referred to as percussion theater by WGI. Most percussion ensembles are affiliated with high schools, but many are independent.

Winds 
Are small marching music ensembles composed of a variety of instrumentations. Many take advantage of marching horns, as well as woodwinds, rhythm sections, and a pit ensemble, similar to those found in marching bands or drum corps. Unlike their outdoor counterparts, WGI Winds compete indoors on a performance area roughly the size of a standard basketball court.

Divisions and classes 
Groups attending WGI events are organized according to a multi-tier system, placed in one of two divisions, and dozens of classes.
 Independent Color guard, Percussion, and Winds divisions are reserved for groups composed of performers who are not associated with a particular school. Independent groups often draw performers from a large geographic area.
 Scholastic Color guard, Percussion, and Winds divisions are reserved for groups composed of performers from the same high school, or high school equivalent, or a school within the attendance zone of that particular high School. The Scholastic division was created in 1980. Prior to the division's creation high school groups competed against Independent groups.

Divisions are further grouped into classes based on experience and achievement:
 Regional A is for new and inexperienced groups. This class is not available at World Championships.
 A Class, often referred to as National A or National, is for groups new to national competition.
 Open Class is for groups who consistently perform at an intermediate developmental level.
 World Class is the highest available class and is reserved for groups who are the most advanced. The World classes in both Scholastic and Independent are the most competitive and the highest prestige.

Historic classes and divisions 
The following are the divisions and classes represented at World Championships.

Notes:
 The tables below are simplified and do not reflect when specific competitive classes and divisions were defined in the WGI Adjudication Handbook.
 Other classes and divisions may be represented at regional championships or other WGI-sanctioned competitions.

Color guard division

Scholastic percussion and winds

Independent percussion and winds

Adjudication 
WGI Adjudication Manuals for color guards, percussion and winds championships divide scoring in set reference criteria known as captions forming a scoring rubric. Each caption is subdivided into elements such as performance analysis, design analysis, and effect evaluation. The adjudication manual is multi-tiered, meaning each competitive class—Regional A, A Class, Open Class, and World Class—has a set of scoring sheets listing differing criteria and descriptions for each caption.

Color guard captions and scoring

Marching percussion captions and scoring

Concert percussion captions and scoring

Winds captions and scoring

Past champions 
Source(s):

Color guard (1978–present)

Marching percussion (1993–present)

Concert percussion (1994–present)

Winds (2015–present)

See also 
 Bands of America
 Drum Corps International
 Mid-America Competing Band Directors Association

Notes

References

External links 
 

Organizations established in 1977
1977 establishments in the United States
Organizations based in Dayton, Ohio